Vaisakha may refer to the following:

Vaisakha, the second lunar month of the Hindu calendar.
Vaisakh, the second month of the Nanakshahi calendar.
Vesak, the Pali equivalent to a Buddhist holiday named after the Hindu month